Una familia con suerte (A Fortunate Family) is a Mexican telenovela produced by Juan Osorio for Televisa in 2011. It is based on the Argentinean telenovela Los Roldán. Arath De La Torre, Mayrín Villanueva and Luz Elena González star as the main protagonists. while Sergio Sendel, Daniela Castro, Cecilia Galliano, María Rubio, Enrique Rocha and Patricia Reyes Spíndola stars as the main antagonists. Una familia con suerte won 4 awards in Premios TVyNovelas: Best young lead actor, best male & female revelation, and best musical theme.

Plot 
Una Familia Con Suerte is a soap opera about Pancho López (Arath de la Torre) and his family. Avon subsidiary president Fernanda Peñaloza (Alicia Rodríguez) discovers that she has cancer and decides to commit suicide. She is about to jump off of a bridge when Pancho López (Arath de la Torre), a public market vendor, happens upon her and attempts to dissuade her. He manages to convince her that life is worth fighting for and she comes back to the safety of his delivery truck, "La Burra".

Pancho López is a humble low income man with strong characteristics.  He's  a generous  widowed family man, always lending a hand. Although he has intuitive business sense, he believes that money is the root of all evil.

Fernanda is introduced to Pancho López's four children: Lupita (Alejandra García), his favorite daughter, who inherited her father's love and compassion for other people. Ana (Sherlyn) is musically inclined and is the tomboy of the family. Temo (Daniel Arévalo) is the baby. Laura Torres de López (Ana Bárbara), Pancho's wife, dies giving birth to Temo who is brought-up by Chela (Luz Elena González), Pancho's sister-in-law; she becomes the mother figure after her sister's death. Chela has had a crush on Pancho before he married her sister.

Pepe López (Pablo Lyle), Pancho's eldest son, is a very courageous and adventurous young man.  He is the apprentice to a mechanical engineer and has a passion for driving. He is able to transcend class barriers, communicating with all people with ease. Pepe meets and becomes interested in a rich young girl, Mónica Rinaldi (Violeta Isfel). However, she is engaged and Pepe must compete with her fiancé Freddy Irabién (Juan Diego Covarrubias) in the professional and personal spheres  for Mónica's love.

Candelaria «Candela» López (Alicia Machado) is Pancho's sister. She is stunning and has a large amount of followers due to her beauty.

Pancho López and his family come up against financial difficulties: he has pledged his house as collateral for a loan that he ends up finding impossible to repay.

Enzo Rinaldi (Pedro Moreno) plots to throw the López and their friends away. Humiliated by his inability to provide for his family's well-being, Pancho has no option but to accept Fernanda Peñaloza's offer to take the post as president of her cosmetic company.

Fernanda also invites the López family to move into her mansion since she highly appreciates Pancho's honesty and reliability. The López family accepts this offer reluctantly, and in their new neighborhood they meet the Irabién family consisting of three members: Vicente, Pina (Daniela Castro) and Freddy (Juan Diego Covarrubias). Fernanda finds Pancho worthy of a better life unlike her nephew Vicente Irabién (Sergio Sendel). Vicente merely bides his time waiting for the death of his aunt and the inheritance that would come with it.  The dramatic change of scenery for the López family results in many humorous situations arising from the clashing of cultures between the rich and the poor.

The attractive and clever Rebeca Treviño (Mayrín Villanueva) takes Pancho under her wing and helps him acclimate to the challenges of the business world. She helps him bridge socio-economic divides, teaching him the etiquette demanded from his new position and how to make decisions in the financial sphere. She becomes Chela's competitor for Pancho's attention.

Pina, Vicente's wife, is a hypochondriac. Neither her husband nor her son takes care of her or pays attention to her. She is the host of her own radio show, «Pina Opina»  (Pina's Opinion), where she is an able to find an outlet for her discontent. She has a small dog that she keeps with her at all times named Abeja (Bee). At one point, Popeye, the López family's dog seduces this pampered dog and this becomes another point of contention between the two families.

In turn, Vicente takes a great interest in Candela and the couple engage in a dramatic love affair and end up getting married. 

The two families experience amusing situations when Ana, who disdains flippancy, falls in love with the irreverent Freddy. Pina becomes infatuated with Sebastian who saved her life. Fernanda later discovers that Pancho is actually the long-lost son she was forced to give up for adoption.

Cast

Starring 
 Daniela Castro as Josefina “Pina” Arteaga de Irabien / de Bravo
 Sergio Sendel as Vicente "Iracheta" Irabien Peñaloza
 Arath de la Torre as Francisco "Pancho" López Peñaloza
 Luz Elena González as Graciela “Chela” Torres de Rinaldi
 Mayrin Villanueva as Rebeca Treviño de Lopez
 Alicia Rodríguez as Fernanda Peñaloza

Also starring 
 Julio Bracho as Arnoldo
 Alicia Machado as Candelaria "Candy" López de Irabien
 Sherlyn as Ana López Torrés de Irabien
 Violeta Isfel as Monica Rinaldi de Lopez
 Pedro Moreno as Enzo Rinaldi
 Jorge Van Rankin as Nico
 Claudia Godínez as Elena Campos
 Moisés Suárez as Lamberto
 Maria Riquelme as Sandra
 Lucas Velázquez as Alejandro "Alex" Obregón
 Osvaldo de León as Tomás Campos
 Francisco Vázquez as Chacho
 Elena Guerrero as Adoración
 Haydée Navarra as Gregoria
 Alejandra García as Guadalupe López Torrés de Obregon / de Campos
 Mariluz Bermúdez as Karina
 Pablo Lyle as Pepe López Torrés
 Juan Diego Covarrubias as Alfredo Irabien Arteaga 
 Noemí Gutiérrez as Celeste
 Ingrid Marie Rivera as Bárbara Palacios

Recurring 
 Roberto Palazuelos Mike Anderson
 Cecilia Galliano as Violeta Ruíz Carballo
 David Ostrosky as Ernesto Queso
 Patricia Reyes Spíndola as Carlota
 Jesus More as adrian

Special guest stars 
 Ana Bárbara as Laura Torrés de López
 Maribel Guardia as Isabella Ruiz
 Jorge Aravena as Sebastián Bravo
 Laura Flores as Yuyú Arteaga
 María Rubio as Inés de la Borbolla y Ruiz
 Silvia Pinal as Herself
 Alejandra Guzmán as Herself 
 Pablo Montero as Himself
 Patricia Navidad as Mimí de la Rose

Awards

TVyNovelas Awards 2012

References 

2011 telenovelas
2011 Mexican television series debuts
2012 Mexican television series endings
Mexican telenovelas
Televisa telenovelas
Mexican television series based on Argentine television series
Spanish-language telenovelas